List of all managers of Ukrainian football club FC Chernihiv.

Managers 
 Figures correct as of August 19, 2022. Includes all competitive matches
* Player-manager+ Caretaker manager
M = Matches played; W = Matches won; D = Matches drawn; L = Matches lost; F = Goals for; A = Goals against

References

 
managers